Timothy Joseph Kempton (born January 25, 1964) is a retired American professional basketball who played the power forward and center positions. Born in Jamaica, New York, he played college basketball for the Notre Dame Fighting Irish before having a 14-year professional career, playing 8 seasons in the National Basketball Association (NBA) in addition to seasons in Italy, France, Spain, and Turkey. He was selected in the 6th round (124th pick overall) of the 1986 NBA draft by the Los Angeles Clippers.

College career
Kempton played for Notre Dame under coach Digger Phelps from 1982 to 1986, appearing in 107 games over 4 season and averaging 8.7 points, 5.6 rebounds, and 1.5 assists on 26.2 minutes per game.

Professional career
Kempton played in 8 NBA seasons for 8 teams. He played for the Clippers (1986–87), Charlotte Hornets (1988–89, 1993–94), Denver Nuggets (1989–90), Phoenix Suns (1992–93), Cleveland Cavaliers (1993–94), Atlanta Hawks (1995–96), San Antonio Spurs (1996–97), Orlando Magic (1997–98) and Toronto Raptors (1997–98). He was also under contract with Philadelphia 76ers (1996). In his NBA career, Kempton played in 280 games and scored a total of 1,259 points. His best year as a professional came during the 1988–89 NBA season as a member of the Hornets, appearing in 79 games and averaging 6.1 ppg.

Personal
His son, Tim Kempton Jr., is also a professional basketball player. Tim also has a daughter, Catherine Kempton, who plays tennis.

References

External links
Basketball-reference.com profile
Italian League profile

1964 births
Living people
American expatriate basketball people in Canada
American expatriate basketball people in France
American expatriate basketball people in Italy
American expatriate basketball people in Spain
American expatriate basketball people in Turkey
American men's basketball players
Atlanta Hawks players
Baloncesto León players
Basketball players from New York City
CB Girona players
Centers (basketball)
Charlotte Hornets players
Cleveland Cavaliers players
Denver Nuggets players
Galatasaray S.K. (men's basketball) players
La Crosse Bobcats players
Liga ACB players
Limoges CSP players
Los Angeles Clippers draft picks
Los Angeles Clippers players
McDonald's High School All-Americans
Notre Dame Fighting Irish men's basketball players
Orlando Magic players
Parade High School All-Americans (boys' basketball)
Phoenix Suns announcers
Phoenix Suns players
Power forwards (basketball)
San Antonio Spurs players
Scaligera Basket Verona players
Sportspeople from Queens, New York
Toronto Raptors players